Roanoke College is a private liberal arts college in Salem, Virginia. It has approximately 2,000 students who represent approximately 40 states and 30 countries. The college offers 35 majors, 57 minors and concentrations, and pre-professional programs. Roanoke awards bachelor's degrees in arts, science, and business administration and is one of 280 colleges with a chapter of the Phi Beta Kappa honor society.

Roanoke is an NCAA Division III school competing in the Old Dominion Athletic Conference.  The college fields varsity teams in eleven men's and ten women's sports. Roanoke's athletic nickname is Maroons and the mascot is Rooney, a maroon-tailed hawk.

History

Early years
A boys' preparatory school was founded by Lutheran pastors David F. Bittle and Christopher C. Baughmann. Originally located in Augusta County near Staunton, the school was named Virginia Institute until chartered on January 30, 1845, as Virginia Collegiate Institute. In 1847, the institute moved to Salem which was developing into a center of commerce and transportation in the region; the school moved all of its possessions in a single covered wagon. The Virginia General Assembly granted a college charter on March 14, 1853 and approved the name Roanoke College, chosen in honor of the Roanoke Valley. Bittle then served as the college's first president.

Roanoke was one of the few Southern colleges that remained open throughout the American Civil War. The student body was organized into a corps of cadets and fought with Confederate forces near Salem in December 1863. The students were outmatched and quickly forced to surrender, but the Union commander paroled them and allowed them to return to their studies. The college company was formally mustered into the Confederate Army, Virginia Reserves, on September 1, 1864, but the students did not see combat before the war ended.

International students

Roanoke enrolled its first international students in the late 19th century; the first Mexican student in 1876 and the first Japanese student in 1888. The first Korean to graduate from an American college or university, Surh Beung Kiu, graduated in 1898.

Coeducation

Roanoke became coeducational in 1930.  A small number of non-degree-seeking women, mostly from Elizabeth College in Salem, were previously enrolled.  Originally named Roanoke Women's College, Elizabeth was a sister Lutheran women's college destroyed by fire in 1921 and closed; the female students finished the 1921–22 academic year at Roanoke.

Roanoke opened its first women's residence hall, Smith Hall, in 1941.  Smith Hall has a prominent position on the John R. Turbyfill Front Quad.  Roanoke retains the Roanoke Women's College campus as its Elizabeth Campus, named for Elizabeth College.  The campus, located approximately two miles from the Roanoke main campus, houses residence halls, athletic fields, and the college tennis complex.

Roanoke adopted the alumnae of Marion College, a sister Lutheran women's college in Marion, Virginia, when it closed in 1967.  Marion Hall, a residence hall constructed in 1968, honors the college and its alumnae.

National championships

Roanoke athletic teams have won two national championships: the 1972 NCAA Men's College Division Basketball Championship and the 1978 Division II men's lacrosse championship.  Roanoke's third national championship occurred in 2001 when student Casey Smith won an individual championship in the Division III women's 10,000m track and field event.  In 2009, student Robin Yerkes secured Roanoke's fourth national championship when she won an individual championship in the Division III women's 400m track and field event.

Sesquicentennial

Roanoke experienced exceptional growth in the 1980s and 1990s. Two campaign plans, the 1992 Sesquicentennial Campaign and the 2002 Plan, also known as "The Difference", were successfully completed with over $150 million raised.  The campaigns financed the renovation and construction of numerous facilities including the library, the student center, and the arts and performance center.

Roanoke's tenth president, and first female president, Sabine O'Hara, took office in 2004.  O'Hara, an expert in sustainable economic development, was recruited to lead formulation of a new strategic plan, one that would advance the college into the next decade.  In 2006, Roanoke unveiled "The 2015 Plan", which calls for expanded academic offerings, an increase in enrollment from 1,900 to 2,100 students, renovation and construction of facilities to support increased enrollment, and growth in endowment resources to support financial aid for more students.  O'Hara resigned in 2007 after unveiling the plan; her tenure was short, but productive with four new residence halls constructed, two academic buildings renovated, a new sports stadium completed, and records set for applications and enrollment.

Leaders

Principals of Virginia Institute, 1842–1853
 David F. Bittle, 1842–1845
 Christopher C. Baughman, 1845–1853

Presidents of Roanoke College, 1853 – Present
 David F. Bittle, 1853–1876
 Thomas W. Dosh, 1877–1878
 Julius D. Dreher, 1878–1903
 John A. Morehead, 1903–1920
 Charles J. Smith, 1920–1949
 H. Sherman Oberly, 1949–1963
 Perry F. Kendig, 1963–1975
 Norman D. Fintel, 1975–1989
 David M. Gring, 1989–2004
 Sabine U. O'Hara, 2004–2007
  Michael C. Maxey, 2007–2022
 Frank Shushok Jr., 2022–present

Lutheran heritage

Established in 1842, Roanoke is the second-oldest (Gettysburg College is the oldest) Lutheran-affiliated college in the United States and is associated with three synods of the Evangelical Lutheran Church in America:  the Virginia Synod, the Metropolitan Washington, D.C. Synod, and the West Virginia–Western Maryland Synod.  The Virginia Synod is headquartered in Bittle Hall, the college's first library now occupied by the Bishop of the Virginia Synod.

Historically, the college has had a small Lutheran population.  Roanoke's student body represents numerous religious denominations; Roman Catholicism is the most prevalent, and Lutherans total less than ten percent.  Roanoke has an active religious life program for students seeking that experience, but religion is not prominent; students are not required to attend religious services or to take classes in religion.

Roanoke honors its Lutheran heritage with an independent board of trustees; the church does not control administration.  The dominant aspect of Roanoke's Lutheran heritage is the college's commitment to academic freedom. Martin Luther encouraged freedom from oppression along with freedom for learning and freedom for service in the community.

Academics

Reputation 

Roanoke is accredited by the Southern Association of Colleges and Schools to award bachelor's degrees in arts, science, and business administration. In addition, the business administration program is accredited by the Association of Collegiate Business Schools and Programs; the chemistry program is accredited by the American Chemical Society; the teacher licensure program is accredited by the Teacher Education Accreditation Council; and the athletic training program is accredited by the Commission on Accreditation of Allied Health Education Programs.

Roanoke offers 35 majors with 57 minors and concentrations.  The college also offers a dual degree engineering program that leads to a Roanoke liberal arts degree and an engineering degree from Virginia Tech. Each year, Roanoke accepts approximately 35 incoming freshmen and first-term sophomores to become members of the Honors Program. These students complete the Honors Curriculum in lieu of the Roanoke College Core Curriculum.  Honors students are offered numerous special learning experiences including plays, lectures, concerts, and service projects.

Roanoke has 16 academic departments:

 Biology
 Business Administration and Economics
 Chemistry
 Education
 English
 Environmental Studies
 Fine Arts
 Health and Human Performance
 History
 Math, Computer Science, and Physics
 Modern Languages
 Psychology
 Public Affairs
 Religion and Philosophy
 Sociology

Roanoke also has eight pre-professional programs:

 Dentistry
 Engineering
 Law
 Medicine
 Ministry
 Nursing
 Pharmacy
 Veterinary Medicine

Roanoke College Seal

The Roanoke College Seal was designed in 1964 by Professor Guy A. Ritter. The Board of Trustees subsequently approved the seal and it is now used to represent the college in all academic settings.

The blue shield on the seal emblazoned with a gold cross represents the College's strong history and relationship with the Christian church. The white dogwood flower represents the Commonwealth of Virginia.  The Lamp above symbolizes the lamp of knowledge. The motto, "Palmam Qui Meruit Ferat", means in English, "Let he who earns the palm bear it". The palm is symbolic of the honor-laden palm leaf given during antiquity in Greece.

Special programs
Roanoke has several special programs that bring distinguished visitors to the college.

The Henry H. Fowler Public Affairs Lecture Series brings respected world leaders to campus.  Guest lecturers have included former presidents Gerald Ford and Jimmy Carter, former Secretaries of State Henry Kissinger and Lawrence Eagleburger, former Polish president Lech Wałęsa, former German chancellor Helmut Schmidt, former Pakistan Prime Minister Benazir Bhutto, and numerous other diplomats and public officials.  In addition, the Copenhaver Artist-in-Residence Program brings visiting artists to campus, including theatrical productions, while the Charles H. Fisher Lecture Series brings distinguished scientists to campus.

Upward Bound
The Roanoke College Upward Bound Program (a TRIO program) was established in 1965 and has helped more than 1,200 socio-economically challenged high school students prepare for college.  The program serves students attending high school in Salem, Roanoke, Roanoke County and Bedford County; the schools are Glenvar, Liberty, Northside, Patrick Henry, Salem, Staunton River and William Fleming.  The program offers classes in math, science, English, foreign languages, computer science, and physical education during the summer and during the academic year.

Student body
Roanoke has approximately 2,000 students who represent approximately 40 states and 30 countries.  Approximately 50% of the student body is from Virginia; the majority of out-of-state students are from Connecticut, Maryland, Massachusetts, New Jersey, New York, North Carolina, and Pennsylvania.

Faculty
Roanoke has a tenure-track faculty of 131 (95% hold the highest degrees in their fields) plus a variety of adjunct professors selected from the business, political, and other communities for their subject matter expertise.

Notable faculty
 G. Samantha Rosenthal (born 1983), LGBTQ+ historian

Library
Roanoke's Fintel Library, named after Dr. Norman Fintel, eighth president of the college, has a collection of over half a million items. Roanoke and nearby Hollins University have a reciprocal borrowing agreement, expanding the size of the library collection by another 300,000 items.

Student life

Student organizations

Roanoke has over 100 student organizations that provide learning experiences outside the classroom. Students may choose from academic, cultural, religious, service, and social organizations including nine Greek organizations.

The Student Government Association at Roanoke exists to give students a voice in the administration. It is the highest level student organization. It is made up of an executive board (President, Vice President, Secretary, Treasurer, and Attorney General) and the Senate (41 members).

Student publications and media opportunities include the Brackety-Ack campus newspaper, a literary magazine titled On Concept's Edge, the Roanoke Review literary journal, and the student-operated radio station named WRKE-LP. Intramural sports are also offered.

Greek life

Organizations

Roanoke has recognized chapters of nine social and two service Greek organizations.

Fraternities:

 Kappa Alpha Order (Beta Rho Chapter, established 1924, revived 1988)
 Pi Kappa Alpha (Phi Chapter, established 1896, revived 2001)
 Pi Kappa Phi (Xi Chapter, established 1916, revived 2005)
 Pi Lambda Phi (Virginia Lambda Kappa Chapter, established 1959, revived 2012)
 Sigma Chi (Tau Chapter, established 1872, revived 1923)

Sororities:

 Alpha Sigma Alpha (Theta Beta Chapter, established 2002)
 Chi Omega (Pi Epsilon Chapter, established 1955)
 Delta Gamma (Gamma Pi Chapter, established 1955)
 Sigma Alpha Omega (Beta Alpha Chapter, established 2016)

Service fraternities and sororities:
Alpha Phi Omega (Alpha Beta Psi Chapter, established 1988)
Mu Beta Psi (Omicron Chapter, established 2001)

Greek history

Roanoke has a long history of Greek organizations.  The Black Badge Society, organized at Roanoke in 1859, was one of the earliest Greek organizations established in the South. The fraternity became inactive at Roanoke in 1879, but had expanded to include chapters at eight other colleges and universities, the last of which became inactive in 1882.

In addition to the Black Badge Society, Roanoke's inactive fraternities include:

 Alpha Tau Omega (Epsilon Chapter, established 1869)
 Phi Delta Theta (Virginia Alpha Chapter, established 1869)
 Phi Gamma Delta (Beta Deuteron Chapter, established 1866)
 Sigma Phi Epsilon (Virginia Gamma Chapter, established 1903)

Roanoke added sororities for the first time in 1955; the three organizations, Chi Omega, Delta Gamma and Phi Mu, were housed in Bowman Hall for many years until they moved to Chesapeake Hall in 2006. Alpha Sigma Alpha, the fourth sorority, was established in 2002.  Roanoke's newest sorority is Delta Sigma Theta, the college's first historically African-American sorority, established in 2005.  Phi Mu (Gamma Eta Chapter) became inactive in 2014.

Housing

Roanoke's Greek organizations reside in college-owned housing.  Roanoke's original fraternity row, constructed in the 1960s, no longer houses the college's fraternities; the buildings have been converted into residence halls.  The Greek organizations are now housed in two locations on the Roanoke campus.  Kappa Alpha Order, Pi Kappa Alpha, Pi Lambda Phi and Sigma Chi have houses on the Elizabeth Campus.  Alpha Sigma Alpha, Chi Omega, Delta Gamma and Pi Kappa Phi occupy Chesapeake Hall, a residence hall on the main campus; each organization has a floor in the four-story building.

Student participation

Roanoke's Greek organizations have a prominent role on campus, but are not dominant; approximately 25% of the Roanoke student body participates in Greek life. Roanoke has over 100 student organizations that provide many extracurricular opportunities other than Greek life.

Campus

Quadrangles

Roanoke's main campus is relatively self-contained with most academic buildings and residence halls built around three quadrangles:  the John R. Turbyfill Front Quad, the Back Quad (central campus), and the Athletic Quad, which surrounds the college's newest athletic facilities and residence halls.  The campus is lined with brick sidewalks and has been recognized for its landscaping and views of the surrounding mountains.  The largest Rock Elm in the United States is located near the library.  The only Alice Aycock sculpture in Virginia is on the Back Quad.

Architecture

The campus architecture is a blend of traditional collegiate and modern styles.  The Administration Building, constructed in 1848 with bricks made on-site, and six other buildings, Miller Hall, Trout Hall, Bittle Hall, Monterey House, West Hall, and the Old Salem Post Office are listed on the National Register of Historic Places. 
Two of these buildings, the Administration Building and Monterey House, were built by the Deyerle brothers, Joseph and Benjamin Deyerle. The designers of some of the other historic buildings are unknown, but may have also included members of the Deyerle family.
Fintel Library, Colket Student Center, and most residence halls have the traditional style of the older structures.  Other newer buildings are more modern; these include Antrim Chapel, the science complex comprising Trexler Hall, Massengill Auditorium, and the Life Science Building, the fine arts building named F. W. Olin Hall, and C. Homer Bast Physical Education and Recreational Center.

National Register of Historic Places

Seven college buildings are listed on the National Register of Historic Places.  The buildings, with year of construction, are:
  The Administration Building (1848) 
  Miller Hall (1857) 
  Trout Hall (1867) 
  Bittle Hall (1879) 
  Monterey House (1853)
  West Hall (former Roanoke County Courthouse, now owned by the college and named for an alumnus, Francis T. West) (1910) 
  The Post Office (former Salem city post office, now owned by the college) (1923)

Residence halls

Approximately 70% of the student body resides on campus.  Residence halls for freshman students include Bartlett Hall, Smith Hall, Crawford Hall, Marion Hall, Blue Ridge Hall, Shenandoah Hall, and Tabor Hall.  Upperclass students reside in Afton Hall, Chalmers Hall, Wells Hall, Yonce Hall, Fox Hall, Catawba Hall, Augusta Hall, Caldwell Hall, Beamer Hall, Ritter Hall, Chesapeake Hall, Maxey Hall, and Elizabeth Hall.

Wells Hall, Yonce Hall, and Fox Hall, known collectively as "The Sections", are Roanoke's most notable residence halls.  Located on the Back Quad, the buildings were constructed in six stages from 1910 to 1958.

President's House

The President's House is in a residential district approximately one-half-mile north of the Roanoke campus on North Market Street.  The colonial revival mansion, one of the largest private homes in the area, was constructed in the late 1930s.  It was purchased in the mid-1950s by John P. Fishwick, president of the Norfolk and Western Railway and a Roanoke & Harvard Law School alumnus, and was acquired by the college in 1968.  Presidents Kendig, Fintel, Gring, O'Hara, and Maxey have lived in the house.

In April 2011, the President's House and its garden were opened to the public during Virginia's Historic Garden Week.  Selection of sites to participate is very competitive; only five Roanoke Valley residences were featured in 2011.

Elizabeth Campus

Additional college facilities, mostly residence halls and athletic fields, are located on the site of Elizabeth College, a Lutheran women's college that closed in 1922.  The area, approximately two miles east of the main campus, is referred to as Elizabeth Campus.  Houses for Kappa Alpha Order, Pi Kappa Alpha, Pi Lambda Phi and Sigma Chi are on Elizabeth Campus along with Elizabeth Hall, a large residence hall with apartments for non-freshman students.

College Avenue – Main Street

Roanoke acquired three office buildings on College Avenue across from West Hall in 2005–06.  The buildings have been renovated to provide classroom and office space for various college departments. With the acquisitions, the Roanoke campus occupies both sides of College Avenue from Main Street north to the traditional campus entrance.

In 2013, Roanoke purchased two Main Street buildings:  the Bank Building, located on the corner of College Avenue and Main Street across from West Hall, and the Old Salem Post Office, located on the corner of Main and Market Streets.  Roanoke had leased the bank building for several years preceding the purchase and will continue to use it for academic purposes.  The post office building, listed on the National Register of Historic Places, is the seventh building on the Roanoke campus listed on the national register; it will be renovated for academic use.

Recent construction

Roanoke opened a new 200-bed residence hall in 2012; the building, the college's second LEED-certified building, completes the third quadrangle along with Kerr Stadium and Caldwell, Beamer, and Ritter Halls.  The college previously completed an eight-court competition tennis complex on the Elizabeth Campus and a large parking lot on the main campus; the projects replaced existing facilities and made land available for the new residence hall. In addition, McClanahan Hall on the Elizabeth Campus reopened in 2012 as the Sigma Chi house; the Sigma Chi house on the main campus was razed and is now green space.

Roanoke's most recent major project opened in 2016; the Morris M. Cregger Center is a multi-purpose athletic and recreation center with a 2,500 seat performance arena (basketball and volleyball), a 200-meter indoor track and field facility, athletic department and faculty offices, classrooms, fitness facilities, and a sports medicine clinic. The center is on the north side of campus; Bowman Hall, a large residence hall that opened in 1965, was razed to make land available. Kerr Stadium was incorporated as a part of the western facade so the two facilities form a unified complex; the center overlooks the stadium.

Roanoke, in anticipation of future growth, has purchased a significant number of private homes on Market Street adjacent to campus, which will provide land for expansion.

Athletics

Roanoke athletic teams are the Maroons. The college is a member of the Division III level of the National Collegiate Athletic Association (NCAA), primarily competing in the Old Dominion Athletic Conference (ODAC) since the 1976–77 academic year. 

Roanoke competes in 23 intercollegiate varsity sports: Men's sports include baseball, basketball, cross country, golf, lacrosse, soccer, swimming, tennis, track & field (indoor and outdoor), volleyball (starting in 2022–23) and wrestling; while women's sports include basketball, cross country, field hockey, lacrosse, soccer, softball, swimming, tennis, track & field (indoor and outdoor) and volleyball.

The college's athletic colors are maroon and gray. Roanoke is particularly noted for the strength of its men's lacrosse program and women's track and field.

Accomplishments
National championships

Roanoke teams have won two national championships: the 1972 NCAA Division II men's basketball championship and the 1978 Division II men's lacrosse championship.  In 2001, Roanoke student Casey Smith won an individual national championship in the Division III women's 10,000m track and field event.  In 2009, student Robin Yerkes secured Roanoke's fourth national championship when she won an individual championship in the Division III women's 400m track and field event. Yerkes is the most decorated athlete ever to graduate from Roanoke, earning 12 All-American honors in multiple events.

Conference championships

Roanoke teams have won 101 conference championships as of May 2013 (47 in men's sports, 54 in women's sports) since the college joined the ODAC as a founding member in 1976.  Roanoke has won more conference championships than any other ODAC school in men's lacrosse with 18 titles and women's basketball with 13 titles.  Roanoke and Hampden–Sydney College are tied for the most conference championships in men's basketball with both schools owning 10 titles each.

Notable alumni

Business

 John P. Fishwick – former president of Norfolk and Western Railway
 John McAfee – software entrepreneur; founder of McAfee
 John A. Mulheren – Wall Street trader and philanthropist; provided funding for the construction of several Roanoke College buildings
 David C. Robinson – movie producer; vice president, Morgan Creek Productions
 Stuart T. Saunders – founding chairman, Penn Central Railroad; appeared on the cover of Time in 1968

Education

 Frankie Allen – college basketball player and coach
 R. H. W. Dillard – award-winning poet and author; long-time professor of English and creative writing at Hollins University
 Carl W. Gottschalk – professor of medicine, University of North Carolina; notable kidney researcher
 Lewis Lancaster – Buddhist scholar; professor emeritus, University of California, Berkeley; past president, University of the West
 Vernon Mountcastle – neuroscientist who discovered and characterized the columnar organization of the cerebral cortex
 Carol Miller Swain – African-American author; Pulitzer Prize nominee in 2002; professor at Vanderbilt University and board member of the National Endowment for the Humanities

Government

 Frederick C. Boucher – United States Representative, Virginia's 9th congressional district, 1983–2011
 Walter M. Denny – United States Representative, Mississippi's 6th congressional district, 1895–97
 Henry H. Fowler – United States Treasury Secretary, 1965–68
 Kim Kyu-shik – Korean independence leader; represented Korea at the Paris peace conference at the end of World War I
 James W. Marshall – United States Representative, Virginia's 9th congressional district, 1893–95
 George Warwick McClintic – Judge, United States District Court for the Southern District of West Virginia, 1921–42
 Park Hee Byung – Korean independence leader; worked to end the Japanese annexation of Korea
 E. J. Pipkin – member, Maryland State Senate, 2003–13; candidate for United States Senate, 2004
 Richard Harding Poff – United States Representative, Virginia's 6th congressional district, 1953–72; Justice, Supreme Court of Virginia, 1972–88
 Sam Rasoul - member, Virginia House of Delegates, 2014–present
 Anthony D. Sayre - Justice, Supreme Court of Alabama, 1909-31
 Robert Spellane – member, Massachusetts House of Representatives, 2001–11
 Frank S. Tavenner Jr. – United States Attorney, United States District Court for the Western District of Virginia, 1940–45
 James C. Turk – Judge, United States District Court for the Western District of Virginia, 1972-2014
 James P. Woods – United States Representative, Virginia's 6th congressional district, 1918–23

Other
 Walter Compton – radio and television broadcaster and executive
 Kristen Wiig actress, known for roles on Saturday Night Live and various comedic blockbusters
 W. A. R. Goodwin – rector of Bruton Parish Church who assisted John D. Rockefeller Jr. with the restoration of Colonial Williamsburg; known as the "Father of Colonial Williamsburg"
 Thomas David Gordon - Reformed theologian, writer, and professor at Grove City College
 Tom T. Hall - country music artist, attended Roanoke following military service via the G.I. Bill.
 John Pirro - lacrosse player and coach
 Ruth Randall - Biographer of Mary Todd Lincoln 
 Theodore Schneider – Bishop of the Metropolitan Washington, D.C. Synod, Evangelical Lutheran Church in America, 1995–2007
 David C. Shanks, US Army major general

Roanoke and the railway

The Norfolk and Western Railway, now Norfolk Southern Corporation, has provided career opportunities for many Roanoke alumni; the NWR was headquartered in Roanoke until 1982 and is a major employer in western Virginia. Roanoke graduates who have advanced to leadership positions include Stuart T. Saunders and John Fishwick, former presidents of the NWR; John R. Turbyfill, retired vice-chairman, NSC; John S. Shannon, retired executive vice president, NSC; and William T. Ross Sr., retired assistant vice president, NWR.

Roanoke has strong historic ties to the railway due in part to its alumni connections. The NWR named a Pullman car "Roanoke College" in honor of the college and Fishwick's Salem residence is now the college President's House. Saunders and Turbyfill served as chairman of Roanoke's board of trustees. In 2007, David R. Goode, retired chairman, NSC, endowed Roanoke's Center for Learning and Teaching in honor of his father, sister, and brother-in-law, all Roanoke graduates.

References

External links 

 Official website
 Official athletics website

 
Historic American Buildings Survey in Virginia
Private universities and colleges in Virginia
National Register of Historic Places in Salem, Virginia
University and college buildings on the National Register of Historic Places in Virginia
Educational institutions established in 1842
Lutheranism in Virginia
Universities and colleges accredited by the Southern Association of Colleges and Schools
Education in Salem, Virginia
Tourist attractions in Salem, Virginia
Schools in Salem, Virginia
1842 establishments in Virginia